Jan Ariens Duif (about 1617 in Gouda – 1649 in Gouda) was a Dutch Golden Age painter.

Biography
He was taken to the Gouda orphanage at age nine, where his drawing talent was discovered and ten years later he painted the regents with himself next to the resident father. He was a student of his uncle, Wouter Crabeth II. He married in 1647 but died only two years later. His religious paintings hang in the Gouda Lutheran church and in the Catherina Gasthuis, a museum in Gouda.

According to Houbraken, he died of a sudden illness, along with two colleagues; Jan Govertsz Verbyl and Aert van Waes (who had just returned from Italy). The RKD disagrees, and estimates the death of Van Waes between the years 1664–1684.

References

External links

Dutch Golden Age painters
Dutch male painters
1617 births
1649 deaths
People from Gouda, South Holland